Walter John Chipple (born Walter John Chlipala; September 26, 1918 – June 8, 1988) was a Major League Baseball center fielder who played for the Washington Senators in .

External links

Retrosheet
Venezuelan Professional Baseball League statistics

1918 births
1988 deaths
Allentown Wings players
Baltimore Orioles (IL) players
Baseball players from New York (state)
Buffalo Bisons (minor league) players
Batavia Clippers players
Durham Bulls players
Granby Phillies players
Grand Rapids Colts players
Leesburg Packers players
Little Rock Travelers players
Lockport Locks players
Major League Baseball center fielders
Minor league baseball managers
Montreal Royals players
Niagara Falls Citizens players
Rock Hill Chiefs players
Sabios de Vargas players
Washington Senators (1901–1960) players
Williamsport Tigers players